Hajdúböszörményi TE is a Hungarian football club from the city of Hajdúböszörmény. It was founded in 1919 and currently plays in the Megyei Bajnoskág I, fourth tier on Hungarian football.

Current squad

Season results
As of 6 August 2017

References

External links
Official Website

Association football clubs established in 1919
Football clubs in Hungary